Karim Haddad (born January 22, 1962 in Dar-el Mraisseh, Beirut, Lebanon) is a Lebanese composer.

Education
He achieved his first musical studies at the National Conservatory of Beirut. He received B.A. of Philosophy and literature at the American University of Beirut.
He left his war torn country in 1982 to settle in Paris (France).

In 1985 he received B.A. degree in musicology at the Sorbonne University.
He then joined the Conservatoire de Paris. He mastered the essentials: 
Harmony, counterpoint, fugue, orchestration, analysis and composition with Edith Lejet (Harmony, Fugue), Bernard de Crepy (Counterpoint), Paul Mefano (Orchestration), Jacques Casterede and Alain Louvier (Analysis), Alain Bancquart and Emmanuel Nunes (Composition) where he obtained Six awards and the "Diplome Superieur" in Composition.

Contemporary Music Composer
From 1991 to 1992 he attended master classes in composition with Karlheinz Stockhausen and Klaus Huber.
Between 1992 and 1994 he participates in the Ferienkurse fur Musik of Darmstadt where he worked with Brian Ferneyhough, and obtained the Stipendien Prize 94 in composition.

In 1995, he followed the computer music courses at the IRCAM and became a member of the IRCAM Forum where he contributed in 1999, by writing the Om2Csound library for controlling synthesis through OpenMusic environment. He then wrote OpenMusic's reference and tutorial.

In 1996, he composed Ce qui dort dans lombre sacrée pour contrebasse for Radio France Presence festival.

First Opera
Recently 2005 he wrote the First act for the opera Seven Attempted Escapes from Silence
Libretto : Jonathan Safran Foer
First performance: September 2005, Berlin Staatsoper, Berlin, 2005

Present
He is still working at IRCAM as a technical advisor for Ircam Forum and continues to compose contemporary classical Music.

References

External links
http://karimhaddad.org
 
 

Lebanese composers
1962 births
Living people
American University of Beirut alumni
University of Paris alumni